The 1986–87 World Series was a One Day International (ODI) cricket tri-series where Australia played host to England and West Indies. Australia and England reached the Finals, which England won 2–0. England and West Indies contested the tri-series for the first time since the 1979-80 season

Points Table

Result summary

Final series
England won the best of three final series against Australia 2–0.

References

Australian Tri-Series
1986 in Australian cricket
1986 in cricket
1986–87 Australian cricket season
1987 in Australian cricket
1987 in cricket
1986–87
International cricket competitions from 1985–86 to 1988
1986–87